Metallicus may refer to:
 Epicus Doomicus Metallicus, an album by Swedish doom metal band Candlemass released in 1986

See also
 Metallica (disambiguation)